Kuben Vocational Arena is a centre for Vocational Education and Training placed at Økern in Oslo, Norway. The arena contains Kuben Upper Secondary School with 1400 students, Oslo Technical School (Fagskolen i Oslo) with 550 adult students. In addition the apprenticeship within Building and construction trade will be coursed at the arena.

External links
Official web site (Norwegian)

Vocational education
Education in Oslo